Series 70 may refer to:

Transport
 Oldsmobile Series 70, automobile series
 Cadillac Series 70, automobile series
 Buick Series 70, automobile series

Computing
 UNIVAC Series 70, line of computers